Lord Arthur John Edward Russell (13 June 1825 – 4 April 1892) was a British Liberal Party politician.

He was born in London on 13 June 1825. He was the second of three sons of Major-General Lord George William Russell and Elizabeth Anne Rawdon, daughter of the Hon. John Theophilus Rawdon, himself second son of the 1st Earl of Moira. His elder brother was Francis, later 9th Duke of Bedford and his younger brother was Odo, later 1st Baron Ampthill.

He was educated in Germany. From 1849 to 1854 he was private Secretary to his uncle, the Liberal Prime Minister Lord John Russell. Between 1857 and 1885, he sat as Member of Parliament (MP) for Tavistock. He only spoke rarely in the Commons, once in reply to an attack on his brother, Odo.

On 25 September 1865, Russell married Laura de Peyronnet, daughter of Paul Louis Jules, Vicomte de Peyronnet. Together they had six children, Harold John Hastings Russell, Flora Russell, Sir Claud Russell (a diplomat), Caroline Russell, Major Gilbert Russell, and Conrad Russell (a writer). He was raised to the rank of a Duke's son on 25 June 1872 and was then known as Lord Arthur Russell.

He belonged to Brooks's, the Athenaeum, the Cosmopolitan, Grillion's, THE CLUB, and the Metaphysical Society. He was involved in the Senate of the University of London, serving on this body from 1875 until before his death.

The ideological gulf between Britain and the new German Empire was stressed by Lord Russell in 1872:
Prussia now represents all that is most antagonistic to the liberal and democratic ideas of the age; military despotism, the rule of the sword, contempt for sentimental talk, indifference to human suffering, imprisonment of independent opinion, transfer by force of unwilling populations to a hateful yoke, disregard of European opinion, total want of greatness and generosity, etc., etc."

Death
Russell died on 4 April 1892, at 2 Audley Square, London and was buried in Brompton Cemetery, London. There is a memorial to him in the 'Bedford Chapel' at St. Michael's Church, Chenies.

References

External links 
 

1825 births
1892 deaths
Burials at Brompton Cemetery
A
Liberal Party (UK) MPs for English constituencies
UK MPs 1857–1859
UK MPs 1859–1865
UK MPs 1865–1868
UK MPs 1868–1874
UK MPs 1874–1880
UK MPs 1880–1885
Younger sons of dukes
Members of the Parliament of the United Kingdom for Tavistock